Mount Ararat may refer to:

 Mount Ararat (Ağrı Dağı), the highest mountain in the Armenian Highlands and Turkey
 Mountains of Ararat, mentioned in the Book of Genesis in the Bible
 Mount Ararat (Massachusetts), mountain
 Mount Ararat (Pennsylvania), mountain in Pennsylvania in the USA
 Mount Ararat, Richmond, large country house at Richmond Hill in London
 Mount Ararat, a mountain near Ararat, Victoria
 Ararat Mountain, an elevation in the Kerch Peninsula